Major-General the Hon. Arthur Henry Henniker-Major  (3 April 1855 – 6 February 1912) was a British Army officer.

Military career
Born the son of John Henniker-Major, 4th Baron Henniker, Henniker-Major was transferred from the West Suffolk Militia into the Coldstream Guards on 20 November 1875. He became commanding officer of the 2nd Battalion, the Coldstream Guards in 1899 and, after seeing action in South Africa during the Second Boer War, he became Brigadier-General in charge of Administration at Irish Command in 1904,  commander of the 5th Guards Brigade at Aldershot Command in May 1907 and commander of 1st Guards Brigade at Aldershot Command in May 1908. He went on to be General Officer Commanding 1st London Division in December 1909 before his death in February 1912.

References

1855 births
1912 deaths
British Army major generals
Officers of the Order of the British Empire
Coldstream Guards officers
British Army personnel of the Second Boer War